William Williams Henderson (May 23, 1879 – October 31, 1944) was an early influential American educator in Utah.  He was principal of Weber Academy in Ogden, Utah from 1909 to 1913, president of Brigham Young College in Logan, Utah from 1919 to 1926, and head of the zoology and entomology department at Utah State Agricultural College from 1926 to 1944.

Henderson was born in Clarkston, Utah to James and Mary Watkins Williams Henderson.  In 1901 he married Survina Wheeler.

Henderson graduated from Brigham Young College in 1903.  He then received a master's degree from Cornell University in 1905 and a PhD in philosophy from the University of California, Berkeley in 1925.

Henderson was a member of the Church of Jesus Christ of Latter-day Saints (LDS Church) and for a time served as a counselor in stake presidencies in the Pocatello, Idaho area.

Notes

Sources
Andrew Jenson.  LDS Biographical Encyclopedia. Vol. 4, p. 580

1879 births
1944 deaths
Latter Day Saints from Utah
Brigham Young College alumni
Cornell University alumni
People from Logan, Utah
People from Pocatello, Idaho
University of California, Berkeley alumni
Utah State University faculty
Presidents of Weber State University
Place of death missing
Latter Day Saints from New York (state)
Latter Day Saints from California
Latter Day Saints from Idaho
People from Cache County, Utah